RSPCA Animal Rescue is an Australian reality television series screening on the Seven Network. The program follows RSPCA Australia inspectors rescue and protect Australian animals. The program is hosted by The Wiggles' Anthony Field.

RSPCA Animal Rescue averages around about 1.6 million viewers each week. It is shown on Sky Living and Pick in the United Kingdom, where it is shown under the name Animal Rescue to avoid confusion with the UK's own RSPCA branch.

See also
 List of Australian television series
 RSPCA NSW

External links
 Official website 
 

Australian factual television series
Seven Network original programming
Television series about animals
2007 Australian television series debuts
2012 Australian television series endings